The 1968–69 Scottish Cup was the 84th staging of Scotland's most prestigious football knockout competition. The Cup was won by Celtic who defeated Rangers in the final.

First preliminary round

The First preliminary round was played on 14 December 1968.

Replay

Second preliminary round

Replay

First round

Replays

Second round

Replays

Quarter-finals

Replays

Semi-finals

Final

Teams

The attendance of 132,870 is the biggest ever for an Old Firm match.

See also
1968–69 in Scottish football
1968–69 Scottish League Cup

References

External links
 Video highlights from official Pathé News archive

Scottish Cup seasons
1968–69 in Scottish football
Scot